Two ships of the United States Navy have been named USS La Salle, after Rene Robert Chevalier de La Salle.

, originally named Hotspur, was a transport ship of World War II
, was a command ship commissioned in 1964 and decommissioned in 2005

Other
The United States steam merchant ship D/S La Salle built in 1920 was sunk by German submarine  on 7 November 1942 during World War II near the Cape of Good Hope, Africa. None of the 60 crew and personnel survived.

References

United States Navy ship names